The 2014–15 season was AEL Kalloni's second season in the Super League Greece, the top flight of Greek football. They also participated in the Greek Cup, where they were eliminated in the second round.

Club

Coaching staff

Other information

Competitions

Overall

Last updated: 12 August 2015Source: Competitions

Pre-season and friendlies

The preparation began on June 28. The basic stadium of the preparation took place from July 17 to 31 to Lodrone, Trentino, Italy.

Last updated: 11 October 2014Source: AEL Kalloni F.C.

Super League Greece

League table

Results summary

Results by matchday

Matches

1.PAOK were punished to give two matches without spectators in their home because of riots during the match against Olympiacos on 16 April 2014 for the Greek Cup.
2.Matchday 6 had been suspended after the decision of the Deputy Minister of Culture and Sport, Giannis Andrianos, in memory of Kostas Katsoulis, that was killed in the riots during the match between Irodotos and Ethnikos Piraeus on 14 September 2014 for the Football League 2. See here for more information.
3.Matchday 11 had been suspended after the decision of the Hellenic Football Federation president, Giorgos Sarris, not to put referees in matches, because of the attack that was made against referee Christoforos Zografos.
4.After the decision of the Deputy Minister of Sports, Stavros Kondonis, all matches of Matchdays 27 and 28 were held without spectators.
5.Matchday 26 was suspended after the decision of the Deputy Minister of Sports, Stavros Kondonis, in order to be made resolutions on combating violence in Greek football.
6.Niki Volos and OFI retired from the league on January and March 2015 respectively.

Last updated: 10 May 2015Source: Superleague Greece

Greek Cup

Second round

Last updated: 7 January 2015Source: HFF

Players

Squad statistics

Appearances and goals

Key

No. = Squad number

Pos. = Playing position

Apps = Appearances

GK = Goalkeeper

DF = Defender

MF = Midfielder

FW = Forward

Numbers in parentheses denote appearances as substitute. Players with number struck through and marked  left the club during the playing season.

Source: Superleague Greece

Top scorers
 	

Source: Superleague Greece

Own goals

Source: Superleague Greece

Disciplinary record

Last updated: 10 May 2015Competitive matches only * indicates a second yellow cardSource: Superleague Greece

Suspended players

Source: AEL Kalloni F.C.

Injuries

Players in bold are still out from their injuries.  Players listed will/have miss(ed) at least one competitive game (missing from the whole matchday squad).

 'Return date' is date that player returned to matchday squad.

Source: AEL Kalloni F.C.

Best Goal and MVP awards and nominees

Source: AEL Kalloni F.C.

Transfers

Summer

In

Out

Loaned out

Winter

In

Out

Loaned out

Infrastructure leagues

U20

* Niki Volos retired from the league.

Pos = Position; Pld = Matches played; Pts = Points

U17

Group A

Pos = Position; Pld = Matches played; Pts = Points

U15

Group A

Pos = Position; Pld = Matches played; Pts = Points

References

2014–15
Greek football clubs 2014–15 season